= Hidden Treasures of Swat =

Archaeology non-fiction book

- Language: English
- Genre: Archaeology
- Publisher: TheBookPatch Publishers
- Publication date: 2014
- Publication place: USA
- Media type: Hardcover, Paperback
- Pages: 100
- ISBN: 978-969-23042-0-7

Hidden Treasures of Swat (ISBN 978-969-23042-0-7) is a non-fiction book based on the achievements of the Italian Archaeological Mission (IAM) in Pakistan and the Department of Archaeology and Museums (DOAM) Pakistan. Six major discoveries by Italian archaeologists in Swat District of the Khyber Pakhtunkhwa province of Pakistan are discussed in the book.
